Australia competed at the 2019 Pacific Games in Apia, Samoa. A team of 42 athletes represented the country for Australia's second appearance at the Pacific Games. Australia competed in six sports.

Athletics
 

Australia sent a team of six athletes (3 men, 3 women) to the 2019 games. They won five gold medals, setting five Pacific Games records.

Men
Track events

Field events

Women
Track events

Field events

Notes
 Melissa Breen was selected to compete in the women's 100 metres and 200 metres events but had to withdraw from travelling with the team.

Rugby sevens
 

Australia named 12 women in their squad to compete in rugby sevens at the 2019 games.

Women's team –  Finalist (runner-up)
 Lauren Brown
 Rhiannon Byers
 Kennedy Cherrington
 Madison Ashby
 Eva Karpani
 Charlotte Kennington
 Page McGregor
 Yasmin Meakes
 Hagiga Mosby
 Faith Nathan
 Cassie Staples
 Jakiya Whitfeld

Sailing
 

Australia named four sailors (2 men, 2 women) for the 2019 games.

Men
 Thomas Dawson – Laser: 
 Will Sargent – Hobie cat, mixed pair: 4th place

Women
 Sarah Hoffman – Hobie cat, mixed pair: 4th place
 Paris Van Den Herik – Laser radial:

Taekwondo
 

Australia sent fifteen athletes (7 men and 8 women) to compete in Taekwondo at the 2019 games, with each winning gold in their event.

Men 

 
Women

Volleyball

Beach volleyball
 

Men's pair –  Final winners
 Tim Dickson
 Marcus Ferguson

Women's pair – Quarter-finalists: equal fifth place
 Britt Kendall
 Stef Weiler

Weightlifting

Men

 Jake Douglas was selected for the 94 kg class but did not travel to the games due to injury.

Women

References

Nations at the 2019 Pacific Games
2019